808 Merxia is a minor planet orbiting the Sun. It forms the namesake for the Merxia family of asteroids that share common orbital elements and physical properties.

The spectrum of this object indicates that it is an S-type asteroid with both low and high calcium forms of pyroxene on the surface, along with less than 20% olivine. The high-calcium form of pyroxene forms 40% or more of the total pyroxene present, indicating a history of igneous rock deposits. This suggests that the asteroid underwent differentiation by melting, creating a surface of basalt rock.

808 Merxia is the namesake of the Merxia family of asteroids that share similar orbital elements and physical properties. The members of this family, including 808 Merxia, most likely formed from the breakup of a basalt object, which in turn was spawned from a larger parent body that had previously undergone igneous differentiation. Other members of this family include 1662 Hoffmann and 2042 Sitarski.

References

External links
 Lightcurve plot of (808) Merxia, Antelope Hills Observatory
 
 

000808
Discoveries by Luigi Carnera
Named minor planets
000808
19011011